Visava Thaiyanont (born on June 7, 1990), better known by his nickname Tomo, is a Thai Japanese actor and former member of Thai pop band K-Otic from the company RS Limited.

Biography 
Tomo was born in Bangkok, Thailand to a Japanese mother and Thai father, he has one older sister and one older brother.

Tomo attended Niva International School in Bangkok, Thailand. Tomo's major in university was business and he graduated from Bangkok University International College in 2015. Tomo is trilingual, he lived in the U.S. for 8 years. He can speak English, Japanese and Thai. Some of his hobbies include basketball, breakdancing and beatboxing.

Filmography

Dramas

Films

TV Shows

Discography

Studio albums 

 K-Otic (2007)
 Blacklist (2008)
 Free To Play (2010)
 Real (2011)

Compilations 

 Kamikaze: Khat Chai (2007)
 Kamikaze: Forward To You (2008)
 Kamikaze: Friendship Never Ends (2009)
 Kamikaze: Kamikaze Wave (2010)
 Kamikaze: Lover Project (2010)

Singles 

 Ya Wai Chai (2007)
 Ying Ham Ying Rak (2007)
 Rak Mai Dai Rue Mai Dai Rak (2007)
 My Girl (2007)
 Freestyle (2008)
 Blacklist (2008)
 Faen Mai (2008)
 Rai Tae Rak (2008)
 Rai Diang Sa (2008)
 Nio Koi (Jongbae) (2008)
 Free To Play (2009)
 Ngao Pak (2010)
 Rueang Khong Rao (Ya Bok Khao Loei) (2010)
 Thing Khao Sa(2011)
 Mi Mee Tur Mi Yak Hai Chi (2011)
 Pur Wan Prung Nee (2011)

Concerts 

 Kamikaze Live Concert (2009)
 Kamikaze Wave Concert (2010)
 Kamikaze Lover Concert (2011)

Awards 
- 2008: Seventeen Magazine's Choice Rising Star as a Group

- 2009: KAZZ Magazine Award - Best Group

- 2009: POP Music Award - Best Idol

- 2009: POP Music Award - Song of the Year

- 2009: POP Music Award - POP Download - KAMIKAZE - Puean Gun Chun Ruk Tur

- 2011: SEED Awards - Best MV 'Alone'

References

Thaiyanont, Visava
Thaiyanont, Visava
Thaiyanont, Visava
Visava Thaiyanont
Visava Thaiyanont
Visava Thaiyanont
Visava Thaiyanont
Visava Thaiyanont